The next parliamentary elections are expected to be held in Armenia by 2026.

Electoral system

The members of the unicameral National Assembly are elected by party-list proportional representation. The number of seats is at least 101, and rises when allocation of additional seats is required. Seats are allocated using the d'Hondt method with an election threshold of 5% for parties and 7% for multi-party alliances. However, a minimum of three political groups will enter parliament, regardless of the performance of the third-best performing party or alliance.

Seats are allocated to parties using their national share of the vote. Four seats are reserved for national minorities (Assyrians, Kurds, Russians and Yazidis), with parties having separate lists for the four groups. A gender quota requires any top section of a party list to include at least 33% candidates of each gender.

If a party receives a majority of the vote but wins less than 54% of the seats, they will be awarded additional seats to give them 54% of the total. If one party wins over two-thirds of the seats, the losing parties which made it over the threshold will be given extra seats reducing the share of seats of the winning party to two-thirds. If a government is not formed within six days of the preliminary results being released, a run-off round between the top two parties must be held on the 28th day. The party that wins the run-off will be given the additional seats required for a 54% majority, with all seats allocated in the first round preserved.

See also

List of political parties in Armenia
Programs of political parties in Armenia

References

Armenia
Armenia
Parliamentary elections in Armenia